Monoedus guttatus is a species of cylindrical bark beetle in the family Zopheridae. It is found in the Caribbean Sea and North America.

References

Further reading

 

Zopheridae
Articles created by Qbugbot
Beetles described in 1882